The Ẹgbado, now Yewa, are a subgroup of the Yoruba people and inhabit the eastern area of Ogun West Senatorial District, Ogun State, in south-west Nigeria, Africa. In 1995 they changed their name to the Yewa which comes from the Yewa River which in turn comes from the Yoruba goddess Yewa. Your clan  now comprises  4 local Governments Yewa South, Yewa North, Imeko-Afon , and Ipokia, while the Ado-Odo/Ota LGA forms the 5th Awori part of the senatorial district.

History
The Egbado appear to have migrated - possibly from the Ketu, Ile-Ife, or Oyo - to their current area early in the 18th century. Egbado towns, most importantly Ipokia, Ado Odo, Ayetoro, Imeko Afon, Ilaro, and Igbogila, were established in the 11th to 18th  century to take advantage of the slave trade routes from the inland Oyo empire to the coast at Porto-Novo. Other towns were Ilobi and Ijanna, which were strategic in protecting the flanks of the slaving routes. The Egbados' were subject to the rule of the Oyo kingdom, which managed them via governor Onisare of Joanna. The Oyo were unable to deploy their cavalry force to protect the routes, due to tsetse fly and lack of horse fodder and thus had to rely on the Egbado people to manage the routes. The historians Akinjogbin, Morton-Williams, and Smith all agree that by the early 18th century this route to the coast was heavily engaged in slave trading and that slaves were the mainstay of the Oyo economy.

The Egbado later achieved a fragile independence after the fall of the Oyo kingdom, but were subject to frequent attacks from other groups such as the slave-raiding Dahomey (who seized, among others, Princess Sara Forbes Bonetta), and various tribes who wished to force open their own slave-trading routes to the sea. Ilaro and Ijanna towns had been destroyed in the 1830s. By the 1840s the Egbado had come under the control of the adjacent Egba group, who used the Egbado territory to forge routes to Badagry and the ports of Lagos. By the 1860s the Egba abandoned the route because the British were actively using their formidable navy to try to abolish the slave trade. Consequently, the Egba expelled British missionaries and traders from the area in 1867.

After 1890 the Egbado asked for a British protectorate and got a small armed garrison, thus becoming independent of the Egba. This area became part of the British Colony and Protectorate of Nigeria in 1914, as Egbado Division in Abeokuta Province. The administrative headquarters were later transferred away, after the creation of the new Ogun State, which subsumed the old Abeokuta Province.

The modern Egbado/Yewa
In 1995 the Egbado chose to rename themselves the "Yewa", after the name of the Yewa River that passes through the area they inhabit. They are primarily agriculturalists, but there is some artisan and textile processings.  They are located mainly in the areas of: Ado-Odo/Ota, Ipokia, Yewa South, Yewa North, Imeko Afon, and part of Abeokuta North. There were complaints that the system of patronage and nepotism in Nigerian politics has caused the area to be neglected in terms of investment.

The area developed a popular style of music, called Bolojo, in the 1970s.

The population level is uncertain, but may be around 400,000.

Further reading
 Ogunsiji, O. (1988). Pastoralism in Egbado division of Ogun State. Ahmadu Bello University, Zaria.
 Kola Folayan. (1967). "Egbado to 1832: the birth of a dilemma", Journal of the Historical Society of Nigeria, 4, pp. 15–34.
 Anthony I. A. and Niran O.(2015). "Yewaland: One Hundred Years Before and After 2014" Yewa Descendants Union, Abuja

Yoruba subgroups

pt:Egbado